12/11 may refer to:
December 11 (month-day date notation)
November 12 (day-month date notation)
12 shillings and 11 pence in UK predecimal currency